A railway warrant is a voucher issued for travel on railways for certain groups such as government employees, company employees, military personnel and retirees at subsidized rates or free of charge, exchangeable for a ticket to travel. The cost of the ticket is charged to the warrant issuer's account. They are issued for use on official travel and for holiday travel. The practice originated in the British Empire with colonial officers and military personnel been awarded warrants to use the railways to take annual holidays. The practice continues in the United Kingdom, India, Sri Lanka.

References

External links
The UK Rail Warrant Account Service

Public transport fare collection
Warrant
Rail transport in Sri Lanka
Rail transport in the United Kingdom